Carl Hecker (also spelled Karl Hecker) was born in Elberfeld, Germany on 22 September 1795. He became a merchant in that city. He was one of the leaders of the Elberfeld uprising in 1848. He died on 17 March 1873 in Bonn.

1795 births
1873 deaths
People from Elberfeld
Businesspeople from Wuppertal
19th-century German businesspeople